Ragda patties (colloquially ragda pattice) is a dish of mashed potato patties and pea sauce, and is part of the street food culture in the Indian state of Maharashtra. It is similar to chhole tikki, more popular in North India. This dish is a popular street food offering and is also served at restaurants that offer Indian fast food. Pattice may be a localization of the English word 'patties', and refers to the potato cakes at the heart of the dish.

Preparation
This dish is a two-part preparation: ragda (gravy) and patties. Ragda is a light stew of rehydrated dried white peas cooked with a variety of spices. Patties are simple mashed potato cakes. In contrast to North Indian tikkis, patties are usually not spiced, only salted. To serve, two patties are placed in a bowl or plate, covered with some ragda, and garnished with finely chopped onions, coriander leaves, green chutney, tamarind chutney, and sev (crunchy gram flour noodles).

See also
 Masala
 Curry powder
 List of legume dishes
 List of potato dishes

References

Indian snack foods
Indian fast food
Culture of Mumbai
Maharashtrian cuisine
Legume dishes
Potato dishes